Spahn Ranch, also known as the Spahn Movie Ranch, was a 55-acre (22.3 ha) movie ranch in Los Angeles, California. For a period it was used as a ranch, dairy farm and later movie set during the era of westerns. After a decline in use for filming by the 1950s, its owner George Spahn established a stable for renting horses for riding on the varied acres. It became known in the late 20th century as the primary headquarters of Charles Manson and his cult followers, the "Manson Family", for much of 1968 and 1969. They were notorious for the Tate-LaBianca murders of August 1969.

The entrance to the historic ranch was originally at 12000 Santa Susana Pass Road (street numbers have since been changed) of the Simi Hills and Santa Susana Mountains above Chatsworth, California. It is no longer in use. After Spahn's death and a wildfire that destroyed the main ranch house and outbuildings, the land was incorporated into the Santa Susana Pass State Historic Park.

History

1880s–1968: Initial ownership and movie ranch
Beginning in the 1880s, a piece of land, including what would later become the Spahn Ranch, became homestead of Mexican immigrant Dionisio Sánchez and Indianan James R. Williams, along with their families. 

The property was purchased in 1928 by Sharon M. Atkins and in 1947 by couple Lee and Ruth McReynolds. Lee built some movie sets next to his trading post on the property to catch some overflow from the Iverson Movie Ranch. With mountainous terrain, boulder-strewn scenery and an "old Western town" set, Spahn Ranch was a suitable filming site for westerns and had been used mostly for B movies and TV series. 

In 1953, McReynolds sold the site to dairy farmer George Spahn, and it became known as the Spahn Ranch. He continued to allow some filming there. Much of the information reported about specific productions filmed there is unreliable. The rumor that the location was used for the film Duel in the Sun (1946) is now known to be false. Among the productions said to have been filmed at Spahn Ranch are The Lone Ranger with Clayton Moore, and several episodes of the Bonanza television series. Spahn Ranch is also often cited as the filming location for the B-movie The Creeping Terror (1964).

After the decline of filming and his dairy business, Spahn added more sets and rental horses. The ranch became popular among locals as a place to go horseback riding. By the late 1960s, however, the ranch became almost deserted.

1968–1969: Manson Family headquarters
Spahn was 80 years old, going blind and living at his ranch when he allowed the Manson Family to move in, rent-free, in exchange for labor. The family did daily chores and helped run the horse-rental business, which had become Spahn's main source of income. Manson Family member Lynette Fromme later wrote, "I was impressed with George Spahn’s hardiness. He was eighty years old and, although his blindness had for five or six years kept him in a world apart, he was mentally still present, living alone and working through all the frustrations of having lost authority in the running of his own business."

In the 1970 murder trial, Prosecutor Vincent Bugliosi later claimed that Manson would occasionally send one of his girls to Spahn for sexual relations. A Spahn employee, ranch hand Donald "Shorty" Shea, had known Manson in the past and had a physical confrontation with Manson. On August 26, 1969, after the Tate-LaBianca murders, Susan Atkins of the Family lured Shea to a remote spot on the ranch where he was ambushed and killed by Bruce M. Davis and Steve "Clem" Grogan.  The Family members allegedly believed he had reported them to the police. His remains were not found until December 1977, when Grogan agreed to lead investigators to the spot where Shea had been buried. Spahn was unaware of the reason for Shea's disappearance; he was never accused of any role in the 1969 murders for which several Family members were later convicted.

In late 1969, Robert Hendrickson began filming the Manson Family at the ranch for his documentary Manson, including Spahn, Lynette "Squeaky" Fromme, Bruce Davis, Nancy Pitman, Catherine "Gypsy" Share, Sandra Good, Paul Watkins and others.

1970–present: Fire, Spahn's death, and incorporation into a state park
A wildfire destroyed all of the Spahn Movie Ranch's film sets and residential structures on September 26, 1970. George Spahn died on September 22, 1974, and is buried in Eternal Valley Memorial Park in nearby Newhall.

The Spahn Movie Ranch site is now part of California's Santa Susana Pass State Historic Park, the "Devil's Slide" section of the historic Old Santa Susana Stage Road being located on the park's western side. Several hiking trails give access to extensive views of the San Fernando Valley.

In popular culture
Spahn Movie Ranch is a setting in Once Upon a Time in Hollywood (2019), a drama film written and directed by Quentin Tarantino and set in 1969 at the time of the Tate-LaBianca murders. The scenes for the movie were filmed at the nearby Corriganville Park in Simi Valley, which was also a movie ranch at one time. George Spahn was played by Bruce Dern.

See also
Burro Flats Painted Cave
Santa Susana Pass

References

External links
 California State Parks: official Santa Susana Pass State Historic Park website
 LAMountains.com: Santa Susana Pass Park website
 Spahn Ranch: From Hoss Cartwright to Charles Manson
IMDb's list of the movies and series shot at the Spahn Movie Ranch

Movie ranches
Simi Hills
Manson Family
History of the San Fernando Valley
Chatsworth, Los Angeles
Ranches in California
1947 establishments in California